Jessica Jo-Anne Eye (born July 27, 1986) is an American retired mixed martial artist. She competed as a flyweight in the Ultimate Fighting Championship (UFC).

Early life
Jessica Eye was born in Akron, Ohio to Randy Allen and Colleen Joanne Eye. Eye has two half-sisters, Jennifer Carlisle-Brunner and Heather Carlisle-Hunter, and a brother, Randy Miles Eye. When Eye was 6, her parents divorced. Her mother and sisters were forced to move to the Washington D.C. suburbs of Virginia. Eye attended elementary school in Virginia but returned to Ohio, growing up in Cuyahoga Falls and graduated from high school in Rootstown, Ohio. When she was 16 years old, a drunk driver hit Eye and her father. She suffered a broken back, among other injuries, and was bedridden for three months. She credits this incident with creating her drive towards success in mixed martial arts. She graduated in 2005 from Rootstown High School and Maplewood Career Center. She then attended the University of Akron, but never finished her four-year degree.

On June 4, 2019, Eye wrote in an article for The Players' Tribune detailing abuse she suffered as a teenager from her father, including an incident when Eye was 14, that led to her father being arrested and charged with child endangerment and domestic abuse.

Mixed martial arts career

NAAFS and ROC
Eye made her amateur mixed martial arts debut in June 2008. She was undefeated as an amateur, winning 5 matches and becoming the first North American Allied Fight Series (NAAFS) amateur women's champion on December 5, 2009.

In June 2010, Eye made her professional MMA debut with North American Allied Fight Series in Ohio, defeating Amanda LaVoy by TKO (elbows). She defeated Marissa Caldwell in her second pro bout.

Eye became the Ring of Combat (ROC) 130 lbs women's champion on February 4, 2011, defeating Ashley Nee by TKO (punches).

She suffered her first loss on June 4, 2011, in an NAAFS professional women's flyweight championship bout against Aisling Daly.

Eye returned to NAAFS to face Angela Magaña in the main event at NAAFS: Rock N Rumble 6 on August 17, 2012. She defeated Magaña by unanimous decision.

Bellator Fighting Championships
Following her first professional loss, Eye signed with Bellator Fighting Championships. She made her debut in September 2011, defeating Casey Noland by split decision at Bellator 51.

After winning two fights for NAAFS, Eye next competed at Bellator 66 on April 20, 2012. She was originally scheduled to face Aisling Daly in a rematch, but Daly withdrew from the fight due to an ear infection. Eye faced Anita Rodriguez instead and defeated Rodriguez by unanimous decision.

In her third fight with Bellator, Eye defeated then-champion Zoila Frausto Gurgel at Bellator 83 on December 7, 2012, winning with a standing arm-triangle choke in less than one minute. The bout was a non-title bout.

Eye was set to face Munah Holland at Bellator 95 on April 4, 2013. However, Eye suffered a back injury during practice that left her temporarily unable to walk and she was forced to withdraw from a fight for the first time in her career.

On June 1, 2013, Eye defeated Carina Damm by unanimous decision at NAAFS: Fight Night in the Flats 9.

Along with Jessica Aguilar, Eye was released by Bellator on August 13, 2013, following the dissolution of its Women's division. Aguilar and Eye were the last remaining female fighters on the Bellator roster.

Ultimate Fighting Championship

Bantamweight division
In August 2013, Eye signed with the Ultimate Fighting Championship (UFC), moving up to the bantamweight division since, at the time, the UFC did not have a women's flyweight division. The anticipation surrounding her debut was covered by USA Today and FoxSports.com.

In her first fight with the promotion, Eye faced Sarah Kaufman at UFC 166 on October 19, 2013. She won the fight via split decision. However, in February 2014, the Texas Department of Licensing and Regulation changed the result to "no decision" with no reason initially given for the change. It was later revealed that Eye had failed her post-fight drug test after testing positive for marijuana and was subsequently fined $1,875 and put on probationary suspension for a year.

Eye faced Alexis Davis on February 22, 2014, at UFC 170. Eye lost the fight via split decision.

She then fought Leslie Smith at UFC 180 on November 15, 2014. She won the fight due to doctor stoppage after Smith's cauliflower ear ruptured mid-fight.

In March 2015, it was announced that Eye would face Miesha Tate on July 25, 2015, at UFC on Fox: Dillashaw vs. Barão 2, with the victor expected to receive a shot at the UFC Women's Bantamweight Championship. Eye expressed confidence heading into the bout, stating, "I know I'm better everywhere it goes. The striking, cage work, ground, everything." Tate remarked that she expected "the best Jessica Eye that anyone has ever seen," and called Eye a tough opponent. Eye lost the fight via unanimous decision.

Eye returned to face Julianna Peña at UFC 192 on October 3, 2015. She lost the fight by unanimous decision.

Eye next faced Sara McMann at UFC Fight Night 88 on May 29, 2016. She lost the fight via unanimous decision.

She fought Bethe Correia at UFC 203 on September 10, 2016, losing by split decision. Afterward, Eye announced that she planned to take a year-long hiatus from MMA competition.

She agreed to a grappling-only rematch with Miesha Tate at a Submission Underground show on December 11, 2016, which was won by Tate in overtime. In May 2017, she announced plans to compete in the UFC's newly created 125-pound flyweight division.

Eye was scheduled to face Aspen Ladd on July 7, 2017, at The Ultimate Fighter 25 Finale. However, the day of the event Ladd fell ill and the bout was canceled.

Return to flyweight
In August 2017, ESPN reported that Eye would make her UFC flyweight debut against Paige VanZant at UFC 216 on October 7. However, VanZant pulled out of the fight on September 25 citing a back injury. Subsequently, Eye was expected to be rescheduled against a separate opponent at another event.

Winning streak and title shot
Eye faced Kalindra Faria on January 14, 2018, at UFC Fight Night: Stephens vs. Choi in her debut in the UFC's flyweight division. She won the fight via split decision.

Eye faced Jessica-Rose Clark on June 23, 2018, at UFC Fight Night 132. She won the fight via unanimous decision.

Eye was scheduled to face Sijara Eubanks on December 29, 2018, at UFC 232. The fight was cancelled, and Eye was re-booked against Katlyn Chookagian at UFC 231 on December 8, 2018. Eye won the fight by split decision. Following the bout, the editors of MMAJunkie.com named Eye their "Comeback Fighter of the Year" for 2018, noting that she had benefited from the move to her natural weight class. She also rose to #1 in the official UFC flyweight rankings.

After over a decade of training at Strong Style Fight Team, Eye decided to change training camp due to disagreements, and switched to Xtreme Couture Mixed Martial Arts.

Eye faced Valentina Shevchenko for the UFC Women's Flyweight Championship in the co-main event at UFC 238 on June 8, 2019. She lost the fight by knockout in the second round via a head kick.

Post title shot and retirement
Eye faced Viviane Araújo on December 14, 2019, at UFC 245 
At the weigh-ins, Jessica Eye weighted 131 lbs, five pounds over the non-title flyweight limit of 126 lbs. She forfeited 30% of her fight purse to Araújo. Eye won the fight via unanimous decision.

Eye faced Cynthia Calvillo on June 13, 2020, in the main event at UFC on ESPN: Eye vs. Calvillo. At the weigh-ins on June 12, Eye missed weight, weighing in at 126.25 pounds, a quarter pound over the non-title flyweight of 126 pounds. The fight proceeded as a catchweight bout and Eye was fined 25% of her purse. She lost the fight via unanimous decision.

Eye was briefly linked to a fight with Jéssica Andrade on October 17, 2020, at UFC Fight Night 181. However, the pairing never materialized due to lingering injuries for Eye.

Eye faced Joanne Calderwood at UFC 257 on January 24, 2021.. She lost the fight via unanimous decision.

Eye faced Jennifer Maia on July 10, 2021, at UFC 264. She lost the fight via unanimous decision.

Eye was scheduled to face Andrea Lee on November 13, 2021, at UFC Fight Night 197. However, Eye pulled out of the bout in mid-October citing illness and was replaced by Cynthia Calvillo.

Eye was scheduled to face Manon Fiorot on March 5, 2022, at UFC 272. However, a week before the event, Eye withdrew due to injury.

Eye was scheduled to face Casey O'Neill on July 2, 2022, at UFC 276. However, O'Neill withdrew in late April due to torn ACL and was replaced by Maycee Barber. After losing to Barber via unanimous decision, Eye announced her retirement from MMA.

Fighting style
In a 2015 interview, UFC president Dana White said the following about Eye:

Known as an agile striker, Eye was largely recognized for exceptional hand speed and her use of variety. During exchanges, she often utilized quick jabs, looping hooks, combinations, and body shots. Against Leslie Smith at UFC 180, she landed 32 strikes in the first two minutes.

In a 2015 commentary, ESPN's Brett Okamoto noted that Eye "makes a concerted effort to pick opponents apart, dart in and out, move laterally and work behind her jab." However, he also described her as predictable at times due to her extensive focus on boxing. Following Eye's UFC debut, Gregg Doyel of CBSSports.com called her "a skilled striker with fast hands." Damon Martin of FoxSports.com has described Eye as "one of the best strikers" in women's MMA.

In addition to her boxing, she made regular use of body kicks. She was also known for her active striking during a clinch. When pressing an opponent against the cage, she normally attacked with knees, elbows, and uppercuts.

In popular culture
In July 2015, Eye was considered for the cover of Cosmopolitan as part of a feature on female athletes. She modeled for the article and discussed how her upbringing had led her to become a fighter. Elizabeth Narins, the publication's fitness and health editor, called Eye "strong and amazing".

A re-mixed version of the song "Till I Die", by Machine Gun Kelly, references Eye.

In March 2016, Eye was featured in Pressure Life, a Cleveland-based theme magazine.

Championships and accomplishments
MMAJunkie.com
2018 Comeback Fighter of the Year
Ring of Combat
ROC 130 lb Women's Championship (One Time)

Mixed martial arts record

|-
|Loss
|align=center|15–11 (1)
|Maycee Barber
|Decision (unanimous)
|UFC 276
| 
|align=center|3
|align=center|5:00
|Las Vegas, Nevada, United States
|
|-
|Loss
|align=center|15–10 (1)
|Jennifer Maia
|Decision (unanimous)
|UFC 264
|
|align=center|3
|align=center|5:00
|Las Vegas, Nevada, United States
|
|-
|Loss
|align=center|15–9 (1)
|Joanne Calderwood
|Decision (unanimous)
|UFC 257
|
|align=center|3
|align=center|5:00
|Abu Dhabi, United Arab Emirates
|
|-
|Loss
|align=center|15–8 (1)
|Cynthia Calvillo
|Decision (unanimous)
|UFC on ESPN: Eye vs. Calvillo
|
|align=center|5
|align=center|5:00
|Las Vegas, Nevada, United States
|
|-
|Win
|align=center|15–7 (1)
|Viviane Araújo
|Decision (unanimous)
|UFC 245 
|
|align=center|3
|align=center|5:00
|Las Vegas, Nevada, United States
|
|-
|Loss
|align=center|14–7 (1)
|Valentina Shevchenko
|KO (head kick)	
|UFC 238 
|
|align=center|2
|align=center|0:26
|Chicago, Illinois, United States
|
|-
|Win
|align=center|14–6 (1)
|Katlyn Chookagian
|Decision (split)
|UFC 231
|
|align=center|3
|align=center|5:00
|Toronto, Ontario, Canada
|
|-
|Win
|align=center|13–6 (1)
|Jessica-Rose Clark
|Decision (unanimous)
|UFC Fight Night: Cowboy vs. Edwards
|
|align=center|3
|align=center|5:00
|Kallang, Singapore
|
|-
|Win
|align=center|12–6 (1)
|Kalindra Faria
|Decision (split)
|UFC Fight Night: Stephens vs. Choi
|
|align=center|3
|align=center|5:00
|St. Louis, Missouri, United States
|
|-
|Loss
|align=center|11–6 (1)
|Bethe Correia
|Decision (split)
|UFC 203
|
|align=center|3
|align=center|5:00
|Cleveland, Ohio, United States
|
|-
|Loss
|align=center|11–5 (1)
|Sara McMann
|Decision (unanimous)
|UFC Fight Night: Almeida vs. Garbrandt
|
|align=center|3
|align=center|5:00
|Las Vegas, Nevada, United States
|
|-
|Loss
|align=center|11–4 (1)
|Julianna Peña
|Decision (unanimous)
|UFC 192
|
|align=center|3
|align=center|5:00
|Houston, Texas, United States
|
|-
|Loss
|align=center|11–3 (1)
|Miesha Tate
|Decision (unanimous)
|UFC on Fox: Dillashaw vs. Barão 2
|
|align=center|3
|align=center|5:00
|Chicago, Illinois, United States
|
|-
|Win
|align=center| 11–2 (1)
| Leslie Smith
| TKO (doctor stoppage)
| UFC 180
| 
|align=center| 2
|align=center| 1:30
| Mexico City, Mexico
| 
|-
|Loss
|align=center| 10–2 (1)
| Alexis Davis
| Decision (split)
| UFC 170
| 
|align=center| 3
|align=center| 5:00
| Las Vegas, Nevada, United States
| 
|-
| NC
|align=center| 10–1 (1)
| Sarah Kaufman
| NC (overturned)
| UFC 166
| 
|align=center| 3
|align=center| 5:00
| Houston, Texas, United States
| 
|-
|Win
|align=center| 10–1
| Carina Damm
| Decision (unanimous)
| NAAFS: Fight Night in the Flats 9
| 
|align=center| 3
|align=center| 5:00
| Cleveland, Ohio, United States
| 
|-
|Win
|align=center| 9–1
| Zoila Frausto Gurgel
| Technical Submission (arm-triangle choke)
| Bellator 83
| 
|align=center| 1
|align=center| 0:58
| Atlantic City, New Jersey, United States
| 
|-
|Win
|align=center| 8–1
| Angela Magaña
| Decision (unanimous)
| NAAFS: Rock N Rumble 6
| 
|align=center| 3
|align=center| 5:00
| Cleveland, Ohio, United States
|
|-
|Win
|align=center| 7–1
| Anita Rodriguez
| Decision (unanimous)
| Bellator 66
| 
|align=center| 3
|align=center| 5:00
| Cleveland, Ohio, United States
| 
|-
|Win
|align=center| 6–1
| Kelly Warren	
| Decision (unanimous)
| NAAFS: Caged Vengeance 10
| 
|align=center| 3
|align=center| 5:00
| Cleveland, Ohio, United States
|
|-
|Win
|align=center| 5–1
| Jennifer Scott
| Decision (unanimous)
| NAAFS: Night of Champions 2011
| 
|align=center| 3
|align=center| 5:00
| Canton, Ohio, United States
| 
|-
|Win
|align=center| 4–1
| Casey Noland
| Decision (split)
| Bellator 51
| 
|align=center| 3
|align=center| 5:00
| Canton, Ohio, United States
| 
|-
|Loss
|align=center| 3–1
| Aisling Daly
| Submission (rear-naked choke)
| NAAFS: Fight Night in the Flats 7
| 
|align=center| 2
|align=center| 4:00
| Cleveland, Ohio, United States
| 
|-
|Win
|align=center| 3–0
| Ashley Nee
| TKO (punches)
| Ring of Combat 34
| 
|align=center| 1
|align=center| 4:34
| Atlantic City, New Jersey, United States
| 
|-
|Win
|align=center| 2–0
| Marissa Caldwell
| Decision (unanimous)
| NAAFS: Eve of Destruction 1
| 
|align=center| 3
|align=center| 5:00
| Akron, Ohio, United States
| 
|-
|Win
|align=center| 1–0
| Amanda LaVoy
| TKO (elbows)
| NAAFS: Fight Night in the Flats 6
| 
|align=center| 2
|align=center| 3:18
| Cleveland, Ohio, United States
|

See also
 List of female mixed martial artists

References

External links
 
 

1986 births
Living people
Mixed martial artists from Ohio
American female mixed martial artists
American sportspeople in doping cases
People from Barberton, Ohio
Sportspeople from Cleveland
Doping cases in mixed martial arts
Flyweight mixed martial artists
Bantamweight mixed martial artists
Mixed martial artists utilizing boxing
People from Portage County, Ohio
People from Independence, Ohio
Ultimate Fighting Championship female fighters
21st-century American women